Donald Clayton "Donny" Johnson (born ) is an American painter and convicted murderer. He is known for his unconventional technique, which involves using a brush made of his own hair and pigment from M&M's candy shells dissolved in water. The New York Times described his style as abstract; Spiegel Online mentioned that his art varies from colorful to dark.

Johnson grew up in a family of abusers and criminals, ran away from home at 10, and spent time repeatedly in juvenile detention. He has been in prison since 1980 after pleading guilty to second-degree murder and being sentenced to 15 years to life. In the late 1980s, he cut a prison guard's throat and assaulted another, and was convicted for both and sentenced to two additional terms of nine years to life.

The Secure Housing Unit, the highest-security unit at Pelican Bay, did not offer any art supplies, so Johnson created a paintbrush using hair, plastic wrap, and ballpoint pen refill, and created paint from M&M's candy coatings.

Johnson is not allowed to profit from his artwork.  In 2006, he stated that he intended the money to go to the Pelican Bay Prison Project that helps the children of prisoners.  After Johnson sending paintings to a friend, the friend organized an exhibition of work in Mexico.  In July 2006 and August 2007, exhibitions of Johnson's paintings were held at the Yam Gallery in San Miguel de Allende, Mexico,   On one night, six of his postcard pictures sold there for $500 a piece.  Prison officials responded by confiscating his art supplies and prohibiting him from sending pictures out, as a punishment for "unauthorized business from inside prison", but eventually allowed him to send pictures out again.

Mike Dibb created a documentary about Johnson’s life. Entitled, Painted With My Hair, the film is due to be released in late October 2021.

References

External links

Donny Johnson: The Official Website

1950s births
Year of birth missing (living people)
Living people
20th-century American painters
21st-century American painters
American male painters
American people convicted of murder
People convicted of murder by California
20th-century American male artists